Psiloxylon mauritianum (known locally as "bois bigaignon") is a species of flowering plant, the sole species of the genus Psiloxylon. It is endemic to the Mascarene Islands (Mauritius and Réunion) in the Indian Ocean.

It is a white-barked evergreen tree, bearing essential oils. It is dioecious, with male and female flowers on separate individuals. It is traditionally used as a medicinal plant, and appears contain compounds that inhibit the growth of Staphylococcus aureus.

It was formerly placed alone in family Psiloxylaceae, but is now considered a basal member of the family Myrtaceae.

References

Monotypic Myrtaceae genera
Myrtaceae
Taxa named by Henri Ernest Baillon
Taxa named by Joseph Dalton Hooker
Flora of Mauritius
Flora of Réunion
Dioecious plants
Endemic flora of the Mascarene Islands